Santiago, officially the Municipality of Santiago,  is a 4th class municipality in the province of Agusan del Norte, Philippines. According to the 2020 census, it has a population of 28,657 people.

History
In the later part of 1898, a group of natives fleeing from the municipality of Jabonga settled in a place recognized by the municipality of Cabadbaran as barrio Santiago, However, in 1924 the Aciga River swelled its banks, destroying all properties, crops and animals along it. This forced the inhabitants of Santiago, Cabadbaran to transfer to barrio Jagupit. In 1936, the same river wrought extensive damage which made the inhabitants decide to transfer at the foot of the hill, particularly at Sitio Paypay, which was inhabited by two groups of natives-the Manobo and the Mamanwa.

The construction of the national highway, which passes thru sitio Paypay, lured more people to settle in the place.

On April 26, 1959, the name Paypay was changed to Santiago through Republic Act 2170, in honor of Senior Santiago or Saint James.

In 1964, the barrio officials of Santiago indicated their desire to become a separate municipality. Finally, on June 15, 1969, the barrios of Santiago and Jagupit were separated from Cabadbaran and constituted into the new municipality of Santiago, through Republic Act 5242.

Geography
According to the Philippine Statistics Authority, the municipality has a land area of  constituting  of the  total area of Agusan del Norte.

Climate

Barangays
Santiago is politically subdivided into 9 barangays.

Demographics

In the 2020 census, Santiago had a population of 28,657.

References

External links
[ Philippine Standard Geographic Code]
Municipal Website Blog of Santiago
Municipality of Santiago, ADN Official Website

Municipalities of Agusan del Norte